Cyril VI may refer to:

 Cyril VI Tanas (1680–1760), Patriarch of the Melkite Greek Catholic Church
 Pope Cyril VI of Alexandria (1902–1971), Pope and Patriarch of the Coptic Orthodox Church of Alexandria
 Ecumenical Patriarch Cyril VI of Constantinople (1769–1821), see Constantinople Massacre of 1821